The Arnold Bakery Building is a historic commerce building in east-central Austin, Texas constructed around 1890.

In addition to being a bakery, the building served many other purposes throughout the 20th century for the African-American community before falling into disrepair. In 2000, the building was bought and renovated for a design studio as part of a local urban renewal project.

The building was added to the National Register of Historic Places in 2004.

Notes

Austin Revitalization Authority: Historic preservation

Buildings and structures in Austin, Texas
National Register of Historic Places in Austin, Texas
City of Austin Historic Landmarks
Bakeries of the United States
Commercial buildings on the National Register of Historic Places in Texas
African-American history of Texas